Gup or GUP may refer to:

 Gup (village chief), in Bhutan
 Gup, Pakistan
 Gallup Municipal Airport, in New Mexico, United States
 Geup, a Korean term of rank
 Kunwinjku language
 Ted Gup (born 1950), American writer
 Girls und Panzer, an anime and manga franchise
 The name of vehicles in The Octonauts
 The name of an enemy from Risk of Rain